Warhol is a crater on Mercury. Its name was adopted by the IAU in 2012, after the American artist Andy Warhol.

Hollows are abundant within Warhol.

References

Impact craters on Mercury